Phacoemulsification is a modern cataract surgery method in which the eye's internal lens is emulsified with an ultrasonic handpiece and aspirated from the eye. Aspirated fluids are replaced with irrigation of balanced salt solution to maintain the anterior chamber.

Etymology
The term originated from phaco- (Greek phako-, comb. form of phakós, lentil; see lens) + emulsification.

Mechanism

The phacoemulsification system comprises three systems: Ultrasound, aspiration, and irrigation.

Ultrasound

The phacoemulsification handpiece has a tip which vibrates longitudinally at a frequency in the range of 27 to 60kHz, with a stroke length of 60 to 150 micrometres. Power is adjustable by the operator as a percentage of full power, and indicates a variation in nominal stroke length. Actual stroke length may vary slightly depending on the density of the materiel it contacts, though some machines use feedback to maintain nominal stroke by adjusting current, voltage or frequency. Nominal frequency is not adjustable. Both efficiency and heat generation are increased with higher frequency, and 40kHz is considered a good compromise and is in common use.

Most handpieces use piezoelectric crystals and the rest use magnetostrictive materials.

The handpiece is hollow and usually accommodates an aspiration line, and the vibratory transducer components are sealed into it. The handpiece is designed and constructed to be autoclaved between uses.

The phaco tip is available in a variety of configurations, including a selection of tip angles to suit lens removal technique. Standard tip angles range between straight and 60 degrees, and more complex tips may have compound angles. The end of the tip may be round, ellipsoid, bent or flared. A variety of designs are intended to enhance cooling and irrigation, to prevent burns.

There are three hypothesised mechanisms of how the nuclear material is emulsified. One proposes that the tip acts as a chisel and removes material on the forward stroke, another proposes that ultrasonic energy is somehow involved, and the third proposes that the tip causes microcavitation bubbles on the retraction stroke, which collapse to exert high pressures on the materials very close to the bubble.

Aspiration
The pump of the phacoemulsification system can be a peristaltic type or a vacuum transfer type. In peristaltic pumps aspiration flow rate and vacuum are independent. Vacuum is the suction force which holds cataract nuclear fragments against the phaco tip so that they can be emulsified, and draws the emulsion into the tip.

Irrigation
The three purposes of irrigation are to maintain intraocular pressure, carry lens particles out of the eye in the aspiration system,and to cool the phaco handpiece. Gravity feed of 650mm water column (75.5mm Hg) is typical. At his supply pressure, fluid enters the anterior chamber at a rate proportional to the rate at which it leaves due to aspiration and leakage. The pressure head is adjusted to suit anatomical variations and the health of the eye.

Sleeves for the phaco tip are standard accessories to insulate the wound surface from heat generated by the ultrasonic energy, and provide a route for irrigation.

Preparation and precautions
Proper anesthesia is essential for ocular surgery. Topical anesthesia is most commonly employed, typically by the instillation of a local anesthetic such as tetracaine or lidocaine. Alternatively, lidocaine and/or longer-acting bupivacaine anesthetic may be injected into the area surrounding (peribulbar block) or behind (retrobulbar block) the eye muscle cone to more fully immobilize the extraocular muscles and minimize pain sensation. A facial nerve block using lidocaine and bupivacaine may occasionally be performed to reduce lid squeezing. General anesthesia is recommended for children, traumatic eye injuries with cataract, for very apprehensive or uncooperative patients and animals. Cardiovascular monitoring is preferable in local anesthesia and is mandatory in the setting of general anesthesia. Proper sterile precautions are taken to prepare the area for surgery, including use of antiseptics like povidone-iodine. Sterile drapes, gowns and gloves are employed. A plastic sheet with a receptacle helps collect the fluids during phacoemulsification. An eye speculum is inserted to keep the eyelids open.

Surgical technique

Before the phacoemulsification can be performed, one or more incisions are made in the eye to allow the introduction of surgical instruments. The surgeon then removes the anterior face of the capsule that contains the lens inside the eye. Phacoemulsification surgery involves the use of a machine with microprocessor-controlled fluid dynamics. These can be based on peristaltic or a venturi type of pump.

The phaco probe is an ultrasonic handpiece with a titanium or steel needle. The tip of the needle vibrates at ultrasonic frequency to sculpt and emulsify the cataract while the pump aspirates particles through the tip. In some techniques, a second fine steel instrument called a "chopper" is used from a side port to help with chopping the nucleus into smaller pieces. The cataract is usually broken into two or four pieces and each piece is emulsified and aspirated out with suction. The nucleus emulsification makes it easier to aspirate the particles. After removing all hard central lens nucleus with phacoemulsification, the softer outer lens cortex is removed with suction only.

An irrigation-aspiration probe or a bimanual system is used to aspirate out the remaining peripheral cortical matter, while leaving the posterior capsule intact. As with other cataract extraction procedures, an intraocular lens implant (IOL), is placed into the remaining lens capsule. For implanting a poly(methyl methacrylate) (PMMA) IOL, the incision has to be enlarged. For implanting a foldable IOL, the incision does not have to be enlarged. The foldable IOL, made of silicone or acrylic of appropriate power is folded either using a holder/folder, or a proprietary insertion device provided along with the IOL.

It is then inserted and placed in the posterior chamber in the capsular bag (in-the-bag implantation). Sometimes, a ciliary sulcus implantation may be required because of posterior capsular tears or because of zonular dialysis. Because a smaller incision is required, few or no stitches are needed and the patient's recovery time is usually shorter when using a foldable IOL.

History
Charles Kelman and Anton Banko introduced phacoemulsification in 1967. Kelman had the idea to use ultrasonic vibrations after being inspired by his dentist's ultrasonic probe and collaborated with Banko who designed the first phacoemulsifier.

Research
Use of ultrasound in phacoemulsification can cause effects such as corneal edema, and macular edema after surgery. However, in some cases, use of ultrasound energy does not generate macular edema. The cause of macular edema in phacoemulsification is intraocular pressure fluctuation during surgery. Intraocular fluctuation can create micro bubbles and generate micro emboli in macular vessels that can cause micro ischemia in the retinal nerve fiber layer (RNFL).

A Cochrane Review seeking to determine whether glaucoma surgery combined with cataract surgery via phacoemulsification has any advantages over cataract surgery (via phacoemulsification) alone, found that eyes that underwent combined (glaucoma and phacoemulsification) surgery had a significantly lower intraocular pressure (-1.62 mmHg) compared to eyes that underwent phacoemulsification cataract surgery alone. The authors note that this finding is not conclusive, as the studies examined had many differences and poor reporting outcomes.

A Cochrane Review of 16 trials seeking to compare the effectiveness of laser-assisted cataract surgery with standard ultrasound phacoemulsification found uncertain evidence suggesting benefits of one procedure over the other. A meta-analysis of more than 14500 eyes and 37 studies found no significant differences between the two techniques in terms of visual or refractive outcomes or overall complications.

In a Cochrane Review, clinical trials comparing NSAIDs versus corticosteroids in the treatment of postoperative eye inflammation were uncertain, but there was some evidence suggesting patients treated with NSAIDs were less likely to develop cystoid macular edema.

Recent Advances
Recent advances in phacoemulsification technology involve combining the ultrasonic and irrigation-aspiration sleeve into a single disposable handpiece. This design reduces manufacturing costs, eliminates the risk of infection and provides better surgical outcomes

See also

References

Ultrasound
Eye surgery